The city of Richmond, Virginia has two African Burial Grounds, the "Shockoe Bottom African Burial Ground" (active 1799-1816), and the "Shockoe Hill African Burying Ground" (active 1816-1879). Additionally the city is home to several other important and historic African American cemeteries.

Richmond's African Burial Grounds

Shockoe Bottom African Burial Ground was active from 1799 to 1816. It was the first municipal burial ground of the city of Richmond. It was historically known as the "Burial Ground for Negroes". It is located at 1554 E Broad St. (alternate address 1520 E Marshall St.), across from the site of Lumpkin's Jail, in Shockoe Bottom, historically known as Shockoe Valley.
Shockoe Hill African Burying Ground, (Richmond's 2nd African Burial Ground) was established in 1816 by the city of Richmond, as the replacement for the Burial Ground for Negroes. It began as two (1 acre) parcels at the northeastern corner of N 5th St. and Marshall St. (now called Hospital St.). It was expanded over time to 31 acres. Over 22,000 people of African descent were interred within its grounds. It is the largest known burial ground for free people of color and the enslaved in the United States. It is located at 1305 N. 5th St., on the northern edge of Shockoe Hill, a mile and a half away from the Shockoe Bottom African Burial Ground. It is one of Virginia's most endangered historic places. Current threats to the burial ground include the DC2RVA high-speed rail project, the east-west Commonwealth Corridor, and the proposed widening of I-64.

Richmond's Other Historic African American Cemeteries

Barton Heights Cemeteries, the Phoenix Burial Ground (est. 1815) later renamed Cedarwood, was the first of its six contiguous cemeteries to be established. The other five cemeteries are Union  (est. 1846) called Mechanics after emancipation, Methodist (est. 1855), Ebenezer (est. 1858), Sons and Daughters of Ham (est. 1867), and Sycamore (est. circa 1879).  Though they are part of and owned by the city of Richmond today, the cemeteries were originally in Henrico County, and privately owned. 
  
Oakwood Cemetery was established in 1854 by the city of Richmond. It is a cemetery which included segregated African American sections. The first people buried in Oakwood in 1855 were African American. Though very few African American burials occurred there until the Shockoe Hill African Burying Ground was closed in June 1879.
 Mount Olivet Cemetery was originally the segregated African American section of the Maury Cemetery, which was founded in Manchester, Virginia in 1874. When Manchester was annexed into the city of Richmond in 1910, the city granted a petition of two residents to change the name of the "colored section" of the cemetery to Mount Olivet. It is now known as the "Maury and Mount Olivet Cemeteries."
St. Joseph’s Cemetery formerly called Bishop's Cemetery, in about 1884 it became a cemetery of African American Catholics. In 1971 it was sold to the Richmond Redevelopment and Housing Authority for use as a playground at Whitcomb Court. Seventy One graves were excavated and re-interred in Holy Cross and Mount Calvary Cemeteries.
 Evergreen Cemetery was founded in 1891 and owned by the Evergreen Cemetery Association. The  Enrichmond Foundation (now defunct) acquired Evergreen Cemetery in 2017. The city of Richmond is presently seeking to acquire Evergreen Cemetery. 
 East End Cemetery was formed in 1897, by the East End Memorial Burial Association. It is located partially in the city of Richmond a partially in Henrico County. East End was acquired by the Enrichmond Foundation (now defunct) in 2019. The city of Richmond is seeking to acquire ownership of East End Cemetery
 Colored Paupers Cemetery established in 1896, by the city of Richmond, on land adjoining the city's Oakwood Cemetery.
Woodland Cemetery was acquired in 1916 and opened in 1917, by the Richmond Planet newspaper editor John Mitchell. It is currently owned by Marvin Harris, founder of the Woodland Cemetery Restoration Foundation.

City of Richmond Cemeteries Division of the Department of Parks

Of the several African American cemeteries in the city of Richmond, only the Barton Heights Cemeteries, Oakwood Cemetery, and Mount Olivet Cemetery (of the Maury and Mount Olivet Cemeteries) are actual cemeteries owned by the city of Richmond, and come under the oversight of the city's Cemetery Division. Barton Heights, and Mount Olivet are inactive cemeteries, burials are no longer made there. Oakwood Cemetery is still an active cemetery.

Though the Shockoe Bottom African Burial Ground and the Shockoe Hill African Burying Ground were originally both municipal burying grounds, established, owned, and operated by the city of Richmond, they were both repurposed, and disposed of once they were rendered inactive. Repeatedly desecrated, both were made to disappear from the visible landscape, and also erased from memory. It is only recently that these two burial grounds have been rediscovered and re-acknowledged, the result of persistent advocacy. The city of Richmond has now reclaimed a portion of each of the two African burial grounds with plans in the works for memorization of both sites. In the case of the Shockoe Hill African Burying Ground, the city reclaimed through purchase 1.2 acres of the 31 acre burial ground in 2021. And in January 2022, a small portion of the burial ground on N 7th St. was returned to the city as a gift. However the majority of the 31 acre burial ground remains divided between more than a dozen owners, and faces various threats, to include the DC2RVA high-speed rail project, the east-west Commonwealth Corridor, and the proposed widening of I-64, and various infrastructure projects. Neither of the two African Burial Grounds are zoned or designated as cemeteries. The Shockoe Bottom African Burial Ground is zoned as light industrial, and a portion of it lies beneath I-95. The various parcels of the Shockoe Hill African Burying Ground are zoned from Residential (Multi-Family) to Heavy Industrial, with roads, I-64, and CSX rail road tracks run through it, in addition to some unacknowledged portions of it having been incorporated into the Hebrew Cemetery. This is to say that neither of the two burial grounds are under the over site of the city's Cemeteries Division, as they are not classified as cemeteries.

East Marshall Street Well
A non-traditional place of interment, yet a place of interment none the less, is Virginia Commonwealth University's East Marshall Street Well. VCU's Medical College (the Medical College of Virginia) engaged  in the illegal practice of body snatching in order to supply its anatomy classes with cadavers for medical training of their students. The bodies were stolen from predominately African American graves. The main target of the grave snatchers or robbers, (also called resurectionists) was the Shockoe Hill African Burying Ground. The remains were discarded in the well, when the anatomy professors and students were done dissecting and studying them. The well was capped around 1860, and later accidentally rediscovered during the construction of the Kontos Building in April 1994.

References

External links
Richmond Cemeteries, Exploring Richmond Virginia’s Historic Burial Grounds
Death and Rebirth in a Southern City, Richmond's Historic Cemeteries, by Ryan K. Smith, 2020
Sacred Ground Historical Reclamation Project
Friends of East End Cemetery
 Woodland Restoration Foundation
Meet Me In The Bottom: The Struggle to Reclaim Richmond's African Burial Ground
Lazarus, Jeremy M., Richmond Free Press, "One woman's crusade brings attention to long-forgotten black cemetery", March 6, 2020
Lazarus, Jeremy, Richmond Free Press, "Enrichmond unveils $18.6M master plan for Evergreen Cemetery", March 6, 2020

Karns, Paul, Richmond Magazine,"In Need of Repair, Since acquiring two historic African American cemeteries, Enrichmond has been at odds with the volunteer group that has worked for years to restore and document the neglected sites", October 14. 2020
 Landslide 2021: Race and Space: Hidden Histories Revealed,THE CULTURAL LANDSCAPE FOUNDATION, Shockoe Hill African Burying Ground
 Arriaza, Rodrigo, Richmond Magazine,"Paying Respect, a coalition urges the governor to investigate Enrichmond’s operation of historic cemeteries", April 13, 2021
Richmond Times Dispatch, "No sign commemorates a place in Richmond where 20,000 Black people were buried. Lenora McQueen wants to change that." May 21, 2021
 Slavery Inventory Database, LLC (SID),  'THE LANDSCAPE OF INJUSTICE: THE EAST END AND EVERGREEN CEMETERIES ', JUNE 11, 2021
Coelho, Micaela, Richmond Magazine, "Restoring History, The Woodland Restoration Foundation works to ‘bring dignity back’ to a sacred site", January 30, 2022
Birnbaum, Charles, The Cultural Landscape Foundation, It’s Not OK to Put High Speed Rail Lines Through the Shockoe Hill African Burying Ground, February 1, 2022
Lazarus, Jeremy, Richmond Free Press,"8,000 potential gravesites identified at East End Cemetery using drone and hydrology mapping software", February 24, 2022
 The News & Advance - 'It’s a good beginning' - Historical marker placed at Shockoe Hill African Burying Ground, June 12, 2022
 VPM npr news - African burying ground historical marker unveiled in Richmond, June 13, 2022
 CBS Mornings - Descendant works to reclaim Virginia African American burial ground, June 17, 2022
Reardon, D. Hunter, Richmond Magazine, "Droning for Souls Researchers at UR and VCU deploy drone technology to locate unmarked graves", June 23, 2022
Fitzgerald, Madyson, The Collegian, "Community gathers for 20th Annual Gabriel Gathering at Shockoe Bottom African Burial Ground" October 13, 2022
Schneider, Gragory S., Washington Post, "Where's Kitty Cary" The answer unlocked Black history Richmond tried to hide.", October 28, 2022
Noe-Payne, Mallory,Radio IQ WVTF, "Richmond couple reflects on 20 years leading the fight to memorialize Shockoe Bottom", November 29, 2022
Palmer, Brian, Medium "Enwhatnow? A Controversial Virginia Nonprofit Collapses, Leaving Questions and Anger" Dec 23, 2022
 Williams, Michael Paul, Richmond Times-Dispatch, "Enrichmond Foundation must be held accountable. Its victims", January 6, 2023
Willis, Samantha, Virginia Mercury " Once a dead end, a Richmond cemetery earns new respect". January 30, 2023
 Lazarus, Jeremy M., Richmond Free Press, "Rail agency begins historic cemetery review for estimated 22,000 souls", February 2, 2023
 Virginia Commonwealth University, East Marshall Street Well Project

Cemeteries in Richmond, Virginia
African-American cemeteries in Virginia
African-American history in Richmond, Virginia
History of slavery in Virginia